Torcols, or The Torcols is a sector of Besançon, Doubs, France, located north of the city.

Geography
The Torcols is located south of Saint-Claude, and situated between Battant and Cras.

Transport 
The line 2, 5, 6, 32, 34, 35 serves the area.

Areas of Besançon